is a Japanese singer. In 2014, she debuted as a member of the Japanese idol girl group AKB48 as a member of Team 8, representing Tochigi Prefecture. From 2018 to 2021, she was a member of the South Korean-Japanese girl group Iz*One.

Career

Honda auditioned for AKB48's Team 8 in 2014 and was accepted into the group at the age of 12, representing Tochigi Prefecture.
In 2018, Honda participated in reality girl group survival show, Produce 48. After placing in 9th, she became a member of the Korean-Japanese idol group Iz*One. She took a hiatus from AKB48 until her contract with Iz*One ended on April 29, 2021.

In October 2020, Hitomi was the model for the Japanese brand titty&co for their Winter 2020 Collection, she later became the brand's exclusive model in 2021.

On October 8, 2021, she launched her own cosmetic beauty brand named NOTONE.

AKB48 General Election Placements
Since her debut in 2014, Honda has taken part in sixth edition of AKB48's annual general election. This is Honda Hitomi's ranking placement :

Discography

Singles with AKB48

Studio album with AKB48

Songwriting credits

Concerts 

 AKB48グループ 東京ドームコンサート　〜するなよ? するなよ? 絶対卒業発表するなよ?〜 (AKB48 Group Tokyo Dome Concert 〜Suru na yo? Suru na yo? Zettai Sotsugyou Happyou Suru na yo?〜 (2014)
 AKB48 紅白対抗歌合戦 2014 (AKB48 Kouhaku Utagassen 2014) (2014)
 チーム8初の全国ツアー 〜47の素敵な街へ〜 (Team 8 National Tour 〜47 no Suteki na Machi e〜) (2014-2017)
 こじまつり～小嶋陽菜感謝祭～ (Kojimatsuri ～Kojima Haruna Kanshasai～) (2017)
 AKB48チーム８選抜コンサート〜僕たちは熱狂する〜 (AKB48 Team 8 Senbatsu Concert ~Bokutachi wa Nekkyou Suru~) (2018)
 Iz*One 1st Concert "Eyes On Me" (2019)

Filmography

Television Series

Television Shows

Radio show

Notes

References

External links
 

2001 births
Living people
21st-century Japanese women singers
AKB48 members
Iz*One members
J-pop singers
Japanese child singers
Japanese dance musicians
Japanese expatriates in South Korea
Japanese women pop singers
Japanese female idols
Japanese K-pop singers
Korean-language singers of Japan
Musicians from Tochigi Prefecture
Swing Entertainment artists
Produce 48 contestants
Reality show winners